Rotman may refer to:
 Brian Rotman, American academic
 Dan Rotman (born 1932), American bridge player
 Jaime José Rotman, retired Argentine football goalkeeper
 Joseph Rotman (1935–2015), Canadian businessman and philanthropist
 Sergiu Dan (born Isidor Rotman, 1903–1976), Romanian writer
 Walter Rotman (1922–2007), engineer and namesake of the Rotman lens

Other uses 
 Rotman School of Management, the University of Toronto's business school
 Rotman, Slovenia, a small settlement in northeastern Slovenia

See also 
 Roitman
 Rothmann